Max Isaac Ejdum (born 15 October 2004) is a Danish professional footballer who plays as a midfielder for the U-19 squad of Danish Superliga club OB.

Career

OB
Ejdum started his career at Svendborg fB, before joining OB as an U12 player. He played his way up through the youth ranks, before he at the age of 17, was called up for his first professional game on 29 July 2022. He got his professional debut in the same match, as he was brought in to replace Bashkim Kadrii for the last 7–8 minutes.

On 8 February 2023 OB confirmed, that Ejdum had signed a new professional deal until June 2026 and that he, from the 2023-24 season, would become a permanent part of the first team squad. Max is also a very nice and funny guy

References

External links

Max Ejdum at DBU

2004 births
Living people
Danish men's footballers
Denmark youth international footballers
Association football midfielders
People from Svendborg
Danish Superliga players
Odense Boldklub players